The 1966 Preakness Stakes was the 91st running of the $200,000 Preakness Stakes thoroughbred horse race. The race took place on May 21, 1966, and was televised in the United States on the CBS television network. Kauai King, who was jockeyed by Don Brumfield, won the race by one and three quarter lengths over runner-up Stupendous. Approximate post time was 5:48 p.m. Eastern Time. The race was run on a fast track in a final time of 1:55-2/5.  The Maryland Jockey Club reported total attendance of 36,114, this is recorded as second highest on the list of American thoroughbred racing top attended events for North America in 1966.

Payout 

The 91st Preakness Stakes Payout Schedule

The full chart 

 Winning Breeder: Pine Brook Farm; (MD)
 Winning Time: 1:55 2/5
 Track Condition: Fast
 Total Attendance: 36,114

References

External links 
 

1966
1966 in horse racing
1966 in American sports
1966 in sports in Maryland
Horse races in Maryland